Braine may refer to:

People
 Braine (surname)

Places
 Braine, Aisne, a commune in the department of Aisne, France
 Braine-l'Alleud, a municipality in the province of Walloon Brabant, Belgium
 Braine-le-Château, a municipality in the province of Walloon Brabant, Belgium
 Braine-le-Comte, a municipality in the province of Hainaut, Belgium
 Canton of Braine, administrative region of France
 Braine Castle, Castle in Belgium

Other uses
USS Braine (DD-630), an American naval ship